Dear is an English surname. Notable people with the surname include:

Brian Dear (born 1943), English footballer
Cleveland Dear (1888-1950), American politician
Greg Dear (born 1963), Australian rules footballer
Jeremy Dear (born 1966), British journalist
Jim Dear (1910-1981), British sportsperson
John Dear (born 1959), American Roman Catholic Jesuit priest
Matthew Dear (born 1979), American music producer
Nick Dear (born 1955), British screenwriter
Noach Dear (1953-2020), American politician and judge
Paul Dear (born 1966), Australian rules footballer
William Dear (born 1944), Canadian film director
William Dear (detective) (born 1937), American private investigator

See also
Deer (surname)
Deere